Alexandre Jean Baptiste Hesse (1806 – 1879), was a French painter.

Biography
He was born in Paris as the son of Henri-Joseph Hesse, a portrait and miniature painter. He attended the École des Beaux-Arts there where he was taught by Jean-Victor Bertin and Antoine Jean Gros. In 1830 he visited Venice and is known for portraits and religious works.
He died in Paris.

References

Alexandre Hesse on Artnet

1806 births
1879 deaths
Painters from Paris
19th-century French painters